Knut Erik Alexander Nordahl (13 January 1920 – 28 October 1984) was a Swedish footballer who played as a midfielder.

Career 
He played for IFK Norrköping and A.S. Roma. He won the gold medal at the 1948 Summer Olympics along with his brothers Bertil and Gunnar Nordahl. The two went to Italy after the Olympics (Bertil to Atalanta B.C. and Gunnar to A.C. Milan) and, due to playing in a professional football league while Swedish football was all amateur, they were not called to the 1950 FIFA World Cup. Knut stayed in Sweden and was called to the tournament. After the World Cup, he was finally transferred to Italy, when he played for A.S. Roma. He was capped 26 times for the Sweden national football team between 1945 and 1950.

References

External links

1920 births
1984 deaths
Swedish footballers
Sweden international footballers
Swedish expatriate footballers
Olympic footballers of Sweden
Olympic gold medalists for Sweden
Footballers at the 1948 Summer Olympics
1950 FIFA World Cup players
A.S. Roma players
IFK Norrköping players
Allsvenskan players
Serie A players
Serie B players
Expatriate footballers in Italy
Olympic medalists in football
Medalists at the 1948 Summer Olympics
Association football midfielders
Sportspeople from Västerbotten County